Radio Iaşi is a public radio station in Iaşi, Romania, broadcasting to the Moldavia region of Romania, and also available in most of Moldova and parts of Ukraine. It features two radio channels, Radio Iaşi Classic and Radio Iaşi FM, which broadcast the same programme but "FM" is a 24-hour channel.

History
The first radio broadcast from the station was on November 2, 1941, under the Radio Moldova name.

See also 
Media in Iaşi
List of radio stations in Romania

References

External links 
Radio Iaşi Website

Mass media in Iași
Romanian-language radio stations
Radio stations in Romania
Radio stations established in 1941
1941 establishments in Romania
Iași